Bowling Green Col is an ice-filled east–west col between Reeves Plateau and Bowling Green Plateau in the Cook Mountains. It was named by the Advisory Committee on Antarctic Names in association with Bowling Green Plateau.

References

 

Mountain passes of Antarctica
Landforms of Oates Land